This List of carrier-based aircraft covers fixed-wing aircraft designed for aircraft carrier flight deck operation and excludes aircraft intended for use from seaplane tenders, submarines and dirigibles. Helicopters includes only those regularly operated from aircraft carriers and not those normally flown from other types of surface ships or land bases.

List of aircraft operated from aircraft carriers

|-
|Aeromarine 39||US||Propeller||Trials||||Temporary||+|| 
|-
|Aérospatiale Alouette III||France||Helicopter||||||Production||||
|-
|Aérospatiale SA 330 Puma||France||Helicopter||||||Production||||
|-
|Aérospatiale Super Frelon||France||Helicopter||||||Production||||
|-
|Agusta-Bell AB.212ASW||Italy||Helicopter||ASW||||Production||||
|-
|AgustaWestland AW101/EH101/Merlin||Italy/UK||Helicopter||||||Production||||
|-
|AgustaWestland AW159 Wildcat||UK/Italy||Helicopter||Multirole||||Prototype||||Flight trials with 
|-
|Aichi B7A||Japan||Propeller||Bomber||||Production||||
|-
|Aichi D1A||Japan||Propeller||Dive bomber||||Production||||
|-
|Aichi D3A||Japan||Propeller||Dive bomber||||Production||||
|-
|Airspeed Fleet Shadower||UK||Propeller||Reconnaissance||||Prototype||||
|-
|Arado Ar 195||Germany||Propeller||Torpedo bomber||||Prototype||||
|-
|Arado Ar 197||Germany||Propeller||Fighter||||Prototype||||
|-
|Armstrong Whitworth A.W.16||UK||Propeller||Fighter||||Prototype|||| 
|-
|Armstrong Whitworth Starling||UK||Propeller||Fighter||||Prototype||||
|-
|Arsenal VG 90||France||Propeller||Fighter||||Prototype||||
|-
|Avro Avocet||UK||Propeller||Fighter||||Prototype||||
|-
|Avro Bison||UK||Propeller||Reconnaissance||||Production||||
|-
|Avro Buffalo||UK||Propeller||Torpedo bomber||||Prototype||||
|-
|Beardmore W.B.III||UK||Propeller||Fighter||||Production||||
|-
|Beardmore W.B.IV||UK||Propeller||Fighter||||Prototype||||
|-
|Beardmore W.B.V||UK||Propeller||Fighter||||Prototype||||
|-
|Beardmore W.B.VI||UK||Propeller||Fighter||n/a||Prototype||||not flown
|-
|Beardmore W.B.VI||UK||Propeller||Torpedo bomber||n/a||Project||0||
|-
|Bell Airacobra I||US||Propeller||Fighter||||Temporary||||First tri-gear landing, on  
|-
|Bell AH-1 SuperCobra||US||Helicopter||||||Production||+||
|-
|Bell Boeing V-22 Osprey||US||Rotorcraft||||||Production||||
|-
|Bell XFL Airabonita||US||Propeller||Fighter||||Prototype||||
|-
|Berliner-Joyce F2J||US||Propeller||Fighter||||Prototype||||
|-
|Berliner-Joyce OJ||US||Propeller||Reconnaissance||||Production||||
|-
|Berliner-Joyce XF3J||US||Propeller||Fighter||||Prototype||||
|-
|Berliner-Joyce XFJ||US||Propeller||Fighter||||Prototype||||
|-
|Blackburn Airedale||UK||Propeller||Reconnaissance||||Prototype||||
|-
|Blackburn B-3||UK||Propeller||Torpedo bomber||||Prototype||||
|-
|Blackburn B-54||UK||Propeller||ASW||||Prototype||||
|-
|Blackburn Baffin||UK||Propeller||Torpedo bomber||||Production||||
|-
|Blackburn Blackburd||UK||Propeller||Torpedo bomber||||Prototype||||
|-
|Blackburn Blackburn||UK||Propeller||Reconnaissance||||Production||||
|-
|Blackburn Buccaneer||UK||Jet||Bomber||||Production|||| 
|-
|Blackburn Dart||UK||Propeller||Torpedo bomber||||Production||||
|-
|Blackburn Firebrand||UK||Propeller||Fighter/torpedo bomber ||||Production||||
|-
|Blackburn Firecrest||UK||Propeller||Fighter||||Prototype||~||
|-
|Blackburn Nautilus||UK||Propeller||Fighter||||Prototype||||
|-
|Blackburn Ripon||UK||Propeller||Torpedo bomber||||Production||||
|-
|Blackburn Roc||UK||Propeller||Fighter||||Production||||
|-
|Blackburn Shark||UK||Propeller||Torpedo bomber||||Production||||
|-
|Blackburn Skua||UK||Propeller||Fighter/dive bomber||||Production||||
|-
|Blackburn Sprat||UK||Propeller||Trainer||||Prototype||||
|-
|Blackburn Swift||UK||Propeller||Torpedo bomber||||Production||||
|-
|Boeing CH-47 Chinook||US||Helicopter||Transport||||Production||+||
|-
|Boeing EA-18G Growler||US||Jet||Electronic Warfare||||Production||~||
|-
|Boeing F/A-18E/F Super Hornet||US||Jet||Fighter||||Production||~||
|-
|Boeing F2B||US||Propeller||Fighter||||Production||||
|-
|Boeing F3B||US||Propeller||Fighter-bomber||||Production||||
|-
|Boeing F4B||US||Propeller||Fighter||||Production||||
|-
|Boeing FB||US||Propeller||Fighter||||Production||||
|-
|Boeing Vertol CH-46 Sea Knight||US||Helicopter||Transport||||Production||||
|-
|Boeing XF5B||US||Propeller||Fighter||||Prototype||||
|-
|Boeing XF6B||US||Propeller||Fighter-bomber||||Prototype||||
|-
|Boeing XF7B||US||Propeller||Fighter||||Prototype||||
|-
|Boeing XF8B||US||Propeller||Fighter||||Prototype||||
|-
|Boulton Paul Sea Balliol||UK||Propeller||Trainer||||Production||||
|-
|Breguet Alizé||France||Propeller||ASW||||Production||||
|-
|Breguet Vultur||France||Propeller||Bomber||||Prototype||||
|-
|Brewster Buffalo||US||Propeller||Fighter||||Production||||
|-
|Brewster SB2A Buccaneer||US||Propeller||Dive bomber||||Production||||
|-
|Bristol Scout||UK||Propeller||Trials||||Temporary||||First flight from moving ship,  
|-
|British Aerospace P.125||UK||Jet||Fighter-bomber||n/a||Project||0||
|-
|British Aerospace Sea Harrier||UK||Jet||Fighter||||Production||||
|-
|Britten-Norman Islander||UK||Propeller||Transport||||Temporary||||Sales demo flights aboard  
|-
|Caudron Luciole||France||Propeller||Transport||||Temporary||||Free French recruiters flew from  
|-
|Cessna O-1E Bird Dog||US||Propeller||Transport||-1975||Temporary||||VNAF landing on  during Fall of Saigon. USMC O-1s flown from 
|-
|Chengdu J-20 B/C||PRC||Jet||Fighter||||Prototype||||
|-
|Common Support Aircraft||US||Jet||Multirole||n/a||Project||0||
|-
|Consolidated N2Y||US||Propeller||Trainer||||Production|||| 
|-
|Consolidated TBY Sea Wolf||US||Propeller||Torpedo bomber||||Production||||
|-
|Consolidated XB2Y||US||Propeller||Dive bomber||||Prototype||||
|-
|Consolidated XBY||US||Propeller||Dive bomber||||Prototype||||
|-
|Curtiss BF2C Goshawk||US||Propeller||Fighter-bomber||||Production||||
|-
|Curtiss F11C Goshawk||US||Propeller||Fighter-bomber||||Production||||
|-
|Curtiss F6C Hawk||US||Propeller||Fighter||||Production||||
|-
|Curtiss F7C Seahawk||US||Propeller||Fighter||||Production||||
|-
|Curtiss F8C/O2C Falcon/Helldiver||US||Propeller||Fighter/dive bomber||||Production||||
|-
First landing on ship, on 
|-
|Curtiss P-36 Hawk||US||Propeller||Fighter||||Temporary||||Flown from  during delivery
|-
|Curtiss P-40F Warhawk||US||Propeller||Fighter||||Temporary|||| Torch landings flown from  & 
|-
|Curtiss SB2C Helldiver||US||Propeller||Dive bomber||||Production||||
|-
|Curtiss SBC Helldiver||US||Propeller||Dive bomber||||Production||||
|-
|Curtiss SO3C Seamew||US||Propeller||Reconnaissance||||Production||||
|-
|Curtiss SOC Seagull||US||Propeller||Reconnaissance||||Production||||
|-
|Curtiss XBT2C||US||Propeller||Torpedo bomber||||Prototype||||
|-
|Curtiss XBTC||US||Propeller||Torpedo bomber||||Prototype||||
|-
|Curtiss XF14C||US||Propeller||Fighter||||Prototype||||
|-
|Curtiss XF15C||US||Propeller||Fighter||||Prototype||||
|-
|Curtiss XSB3C||US||Propeller||Dive bomber||n/a||Project||0||
|-
|Dassault Étendard IV||France||Jet||Fighter||||Production||||
|-
|Dassault Rafale M||France||Jet||Fighter||||Production||||
|-
|Dassault-Breguet Super Étendard||France||Jet||Fighter-bomber||||Production||||
|-
|de Havilland Canada DHC-3 Otter||Canada||Propeller||Transport||||Temporary||||Suez Crisis, UNEF flights off  
|-
|de Havilland Canada DHC-5 Buffalo||Canada||Propeller||Transport||||Temporary||||QSRA trials from 
|-
|de Havilland Canada L-20 Beaver||Canada||Propeller||Transport||||Temporary||||Lebanon crisis, flown from  
|-
|de Havilland Sea Hornet||UK||Propeller||Fighter||||Production||||
|-
|de Havilland Sea Mosquito||UK||Propeller||Torpedo bomber/trainer||||Production||||
|-
|de Havilland Sea Vampire||UK||Jet||Fighter||||Production||||
|-
|de Havilland Sea Venom||UK||Jet||Fighter||||Production|||| 
|-
|de Havilland Sea Vixen||UK||Jet||Fighter||||Production||||
|-
|Dewoitine D.1ter||France||Propeller||Fighter||||Production||||
|-
|Dewoitine D.373 & 376||France||Propeller||Fighter||||Production||||
|-
|Douglas A-3 Skywarrior||US||Jet||Bomber||||Production|||| 
|-
|Douglas A-4 Skyhawk||US||Jet||Bomber||||Production|||| 
|-
|Douglas A2D Skyshark||US||Propeller||Bomber||||Prototype||||
|-
|Douglas AD Skyraider||US||Propeller||Bomber||||Production||||
|-
|Douglas BTD Destroyer||US||Propeller||Torpedo bomber||||Production||||
|-
|Douglas DT||US||Propeller||Torpedo bomber||||Production||||
|-
|Douglas F3D Skynight||US||Jet||Fighter||||Production|||| 
|-
|Douglas F4D Skyray||US||Jet||Fighter||||Production||||
|-
|Douglas F5D Skylancer||US||Jet||Fighter||||Prototype||||
|-
|Douglas F6D Missileer||US||Jet||Fighter||n/a||Project||0||
|-
|Douglas R4D-5||US||Propeller||Transport||||Temporary||||Highjump flights from 
|-
|Douglas SBD Dauntless||US||Propeller||Dive bomber||||Production||||
|-
|Douglas T2D||US||Propeller||Torpedo bomber||||Production||||
|-
|Douglas TBD Devastator||US||Propeller||Torpedo bomber||||Production||||
|-
|Douglas XT3D||US||Propeller||Torpedo bomber||||Prototype||||
|-
|Douglas XTB2D Skypirate||US||Propeller||Torpedo bomber||||Prototype||||
|-
|Eberhart F2G||US||Propeller||Fighter||||Prototype||||
|-
|Eberhart FG||US||Propeller||Fighter||||Prototype||||
|-
|Eurocopter AS332 Super Puma||France||Helicopter||||||Production||||
|-
|Eurocopter AS365 Dauphin||France||Helicopter||||||Production||||
|-
|Eurocopter Fennec||France||Helicopter||ASW/Transport||||Production||||rebranded Ecreuil
|-
|Fairey Albacore||UK||Propeller||Torpedo/dive bomber||||Production||||
|-
|Fairey Barracuda||UK||Propeller||Torpedo/dive bomber||||Production||||
|-
|Fairey Firefly III/IIIM||UK||Propeller||Fighter||||Prototype||||
|-
|Fairey Firefly||UK||Propeller||Fighter-bomber||||Production||||
|-
|Fairey Fleetwing||UK||Propeller||Fighter||||Prototype||||
|-
|Fairey Flycatcher||UK||Propeller||Fighter||||Production||||
|-
|Fairey Fox Mk.IA||UK||Propeller||Trials||||Temporary|||| 
|-
|Fairey Fulmar||UK||Propeller||Fighter||||Production||||
|-
|Fairey Gannet||UK||Propeller||ASW/AEW||||Production||||
|-
|Fairey III||UK||Propeller||Reconnaissance||||Production||||
|-
|Fairey Seal||UK||Propeller||Reconnaissance||||Production||||
|-
|Fairey Spearfish||UK||Propeller||Torpedo/dive bomber||||Prototype||||
|-
|Fairey Swordfish||UK||Propeller||Torpedo bomber||||Production||||
|-
|Fiat G.50 bis/A Freccia||Italy||Propeller||Fighter||||Prototype||||
|-
|Fieseler Fi 167||Germany||Propeller||Dive bomber||||Production||||
|-
|Fouga CM.175 Zéphyr M||France||Jet||Trainer||||Production||||
|-
|General Aircraft Fleet Shadower||UK||Propeller||Reconnaissance||||Prototype||||
|-
|General Dynamics-Grumman F-111B||US||Jet||Fighter||||Prototype||||
|-
|Gloster Gambet||UK||Propeller||Fighter||||Prototype||||
|-
|Gloster Gladiator II||UK||Propeller||Fighter||||Temporary||||Norwegian Campaign, flown from 
|-
|Gloster Gnatsnapper||UK||Propeller||Fighter||||Prototype||||(or 3)
|-
|Gloster Meteor F.3 (Derwent 5)||UK||Jet||Trials||||Temporary|||| and  
|-
|Gloster Nightjar||UK||Propeller||Fighter||||Production||||
|-
|Gloster Sea Gladiator||UK||Propeller||Fighter||||Production||||
|-
|Gloster Sparrowhawk III||UK||Propeller||Fighter||||Production||||
|-
|Gloster TSR.38||UK||Propeller||Torpedo bomber||||Prototype||||
|-
|Goodyear F2G Corsair||US||Propeller||Fighter||||Prototype||||
|-
|Gourdou-Leseurre GL.22||France||Propeller||Trainer||||Production|||| 
|-
|Great Lakes BG||US||Propeller||Bomber||||Production||||
|-
|Great Lakes XTBG||US||Propeller||Torpedo bomber||||Prototype||||
|-
|Grumman A-6 Intruder||US||Jet||Bomber||||Production|||| 
|-
|Grumman AF Guardian||US||Propeller||ASW||||Production|||| 
|-
|Grumman C-1 Trader||US||Propeller||Transport||||Production|||| 
|-
|Grumman C-2 Greyhound||US||Propeller||Transport||||Production||||
|-
|Grumman E-1 Tracer||US||Propeller||AEW||||Production|||| 
|-
|Grumman E-2 Hawkeye||US||Propeller||AEW||||Production|||| 
|-
|Grumman EA-6B Prowler||US||Jet||Electronic Warfare||||Production||||
|-
|Grumman F-9 Cougar||US||Jet||Fighter||||Production|||| 
|-
|Grumman F-11 Tiger||US||Jet||Fighter||||Production||||
|-
|Grumman F-14 Tomcat||US||Jet||Fighter||||Production|||| 
|-
|Grumman FF||US||Propeller||Fighter||||Production||||
|-
|Grumman F2F||US||Propeller||Fighter||||Production||||
|-
|Grumman F3F||US||Propeller||Fighter||||Production||||
|-
|Grumman F4F Wildcat||US||Propeller||Fighter||||Production||||
|-
|Grumman F6F Hellcat||US||Propeller||Fighter||||Production||||
|-
|Grumman F7F Tigercat||US||Propeller||Fighter||||Production||||
|-
|Grumman F8F Bearcat||US||Propeller||Fighter||||Production||||
|-
|Grumman F9F Panther||US||Jet||Fighter||||Production|||| 
|-
|Grumman G-118||US||Jet||Fighter||n/a||Project||0||
|-
|Grumman J2F Duck||US||Propeller||Transport/SAR||||Production||||
|-
|Grumman S-2 Tracker||US||Propeller||ASW||||Production|||| 
|-
|Grumman SF||US||Propeller||Fighter||||Production||||
|-
|Grumman TBF Avenger||US||Propeller||Torpedo bomber||||Production||||
|-
|Grumman XF10F Jaguar||US||Jet||Fighter||||Prototype||||
|-
|Grumman XF5F Skyrocket||US||Propeller||Fighter||||Prototype||||
|-
|Grumman XSBF||US||Propeller||Bomber||||Prototype||||
|-
|Grumman XTB2F||US||Propeller||Torpedo bomber||n/a||Project||0||
|-
|Grumman XTSF||US||Propeller||Torpedo bomber||n/a||Project||0||
|-
|HAL Naval Tejas||India||Jet||Fighter||||Prototype|||| 
|-
|Hall XFH-1||US||Propeller||Fighter||||Prototype||||
|-
|Handley Page H.P.46||UK||Propeller||Torpedo bomber||||Prototype||||
|-
|Handley Page Hanley||UK||Propeller||Torpedo bomber||||Prototype||||
|-
|Handley Page Hendon||UK||Propeller||Torpedo bomber||||Prototype||||
|-
|Handley Page HP.14||UK||Propeller||Reconnaissance||||Prototype||||
|-
|Handley Page HPS-1||UK||Propeller||Fighter||||Prototype||||
|-
|Hanriot HD.1||France||Propeller||Trials||||Temporary||+||
|-
|Hanriot HD.2||France||Propeller||Trials||||Temporary||||
|-
|Hanriot HD.3||France||Propeller||Trials||||Temporary||||
|-
|Hanriot HD.20||France||Propeller||Fighter||||Prototype||||
|-
|Hawker Hedgehog||UK||Propeller||Fighter||||Prototype||||
|-
|Hawker Hoopoe||UK||Propeller||Fighter||||Prototype||||
|-
|Hawker Hurricane I||UK||Propeller||Fighter||||Temporary||||Norwegian Campaign, flown from 
|-
|Hawker Nimrod||UK||Propeller||Fighter||||Production||||
|-
|Hawker Osprey/Naval Hart||UK||Propeller||Fighter/reconnaissance||||Production||||
|-
|Hawker Sea Fury||UK||Propeller||Fighter||||Production||||
|-
|Hawker Sea Hawk||UK||Jet||Fighter||||Production|||| 
|-
|Hawker Sea Hurricane||UK||Propeller||Fighter||||Production||+||
|-
|Hawker Siddeley P.1154||UK||Jet||Fighter||n/a||Project||0||
|-
|Hawker Siddeley P.139B||UK||Jet||AEW||n/a||Project||0||
|-
|Heinkel HD 23||Germany||Propeller||Fighter||||Prototype||||
|-
|Junkers Ju 87C||Germany||Propeller||Dive bomber||||Prototype||||
|-
|Kaiser-Fleetwings XBTK||US||Propeller||Torpedo bomber||||Prototype||||
|-
|Kaman SH-2 Seasprite||US||Helicopter||ASW||||Production||||
|-
|Kaman SH-2G Super Seasprite||US||Helicopter||ASW||||Production||||
|-
|Kamov Ka-20||USSR||Helicopter||ASW/Transport||||Prototype||||
|-
|Kamov Ka-25||USSR||Helicopter||ASW/EW/AEW||||Production||~||
|-
|Kamov Ka-27, Ka-28 & Ka-32||USSR||Helicopter||ASW/AEW/Transport||||Production||||
|-
|Kawanishi K-11||Japan||Propeller||Fighter||||Prototype||||
|-
|Kokusai Ki-76||Japan||Propeller||Reconnaissance||||Production||||
|-
|Latécoère 299||France||Propeller||Torpedo/dive bomber||||Prototype||||
|-
|Les Mureaux 1 C.1 Express-Marin||France||Propeller||Fighter||||Prototype||||
|-
|Levasseur PL.10, 101 & 107||France||Propeller||Reconnaissance||||Production||||
|-
|Levasseur PL.14||France||Propeller||Torpedo bomber||||Production||||
|-
|Levasseur PL.2||France||Propeller||Torpedo bomber||||Production||||
|-
|Levasseur PL.4||France||Propeller||Reconnaissance||||Production||||
|-
|Levasseur PL.5||France||Propeller||Fighter||||Production||||& 9
|-
|Levasseur PL.7||France||Propeller||Torpedo bomber||||Production||||
|-
|Lévy-Biche LB.2||France||Propeller||Fighter||||Production||||
|-
|Lockheed XJO-3 Electra Junior||US||Propeller||Trials||||Temporary||||Nosewheel trials flown from 
|-
|Lockheed KC-130F Hercules||US||Propeller||Trials||||Temporary||||USMC trials from  
|-
|Lockheed Martin F-35B & C Lightning II||US||Jet||Fighter||||Production||||
|-
|Lockheed P-80A Shooting Star||US||Jet||Trials||||Temporary||||USAAF jet flown from 
|-
|Lockheed P2V-3C Neptune||US||Propeller||Trials||–1951||Temporary||||Nuclear bomber from 
|-
|Lockheed S-3 Viking||US||Jet||ASW||||Production||||
|-
|Lockheed T2V SeaStar||US||Jet||Trainer||||Production||||
|-
|Lockheed U-2C||US||Jet||Reconnaissance||||Temporary||||Monitoring French nuclear tests from  
|-
|Lockheed U-2G||US||Jet||Reconnaissance||||Prototype|||| 
|-
|Lockheed U-2R||US||Jet||Trials||||Temporary||||
|-
|Loening OL-8A||US||Propeller||Reconnaissance||||Production||||
|-
|Loening XFL||US||Propeller||Fighter||n/a||Project||0||
|-
|Loire-Gourdou-Leseurre LGL.32||France||Propeller||Fighter||||Production||||
|-
|Loire-Nieuport LN.401||France||Propeller||Dive bomber||||Production||||
|-
|Mann Egerton Type H||UK||Propeller||Fighter||||Prototype|||| 
|-
|Martin AM Mauler||US||Propeller||Bomber||||Production||||
|-
|Martin BM||US||Propeller||Bomber||||Production||||
|-
|Martin T3M||US||Propeller||Torpedo bomber||||Production||||
|-
|Martin T4M & Great Lakes TG||US||Propeller||Torpedo bomber||||Production||||
|-
|Martin XT6M||US||Propeller||Torpedo bomber||||Prototype||||
|-
|McDonnell Douglas A-12 Avenger II||US||Jet||Bomber||n/a||Project||0||
|-
|McDonnell Douglas F-4 Phantom II||US||Jet||Fighter||||Production|||| 
|-
|McDonnell Douglas T-45 Goshawk||US||Jet||Trainer||||Production||||
|-
|McDonnell FH Phantom||US||Jet||Fighter||||Production||||
|-
|McDonnell F2H Banshee||US||Jet||Fighter||||Production|||| 
|-
|McDonnell F3H Demon||US||Jet||Fighter||||Production||||
|-
|McDonnell-Douglas AV-8B Harrier II||US||Jet||Bomber||–1985||Production||||
|-
|McDonnell-Douglas F/A-18 Hornet||US||Jet||Fighter-bomber||||Production||||
|-
|Messerschmitt Bf 109T-1||Germany||Propeller||Fighter||||Prototype||||
|-
|Mikoyan MiG-29K||USSR||Jet||Fighter||||Production||||
|-
|Mitsubishi 1MF||Japan||Propeller||Fighter||||Production||||
|-
|Mitsubishi 1MF9||Japan||Propeller||Fighter||||Production||||
|-
|Mitsubishi 1MT||Japan||Propeller||Torpedo bomber||||Production||||
|-
|Mitsubishi 2MR||Japan||Propeller||Reconnaissance||||Production||||
|-
|Mitsubishi 3MT5||Japan||Propeller||Torpedo bomber||||Production||||
|-
|Mitsubishi A5M||Japan||Propeller||Fighter||||Production||||
|-
|Mitsubishi A6M Zero||Japan||Propeller||Fighter||||Production||||
|-
|Mitsubishi A7M||Japan||Propeller||Fighter||||Prototype||||
|-
|Mitsubishi B1M||Japan||Propeller||Bomber||||Production||||
|-
|Mitsubishi B2M||Japan||Propeller||Bomber||||Production||||
|-
|Mitsubishi B5M||Japan||Propeller||Bomber||||Production||||
|-
|Morane-Saulnier MS.226||France||Propeller||Fighter||||Production||||
|-
|Morane-Saulnier MS.474 Vanneau IV||France||Propeller||Trainer||||Production||||
|-
|Morane-Saulnier MS.500 Criquet||France||Propeller||Transport||–1949||Temporary||||Operated from Arromanches during the First Indochina War
|-
|Nakajima A1N||Japan||Propeller||Fighter||||Production||||
|-
|Nakajima A2N||Japan||Propeller||Fighter||||Production|| ca.||
|-
|Nakajima A4N||Japan||Propeller||Fighter||||Production||||
|-
|Nakajima B3N||Japan||Propeller||Bomber||||Prototype||||
|-
|Nakajima B4N||Japan||Propeller||Bomber||||Prototype||||
|-
|Nakajima B5N||Japan||Propeller||Bomber||||Production||||
|-
|Nakajima B6N||Japan||Propeller||Bomber||||Production||||
|-
|Nakajima C3N||Japan||Propeller||Reconnaissance||||Production||||
|-
|Nakajima C6N||Japan||Propeller||Reconnaissance||||Production||||
|-
|Naval Aircraft Factory SBN||US||Propeller||Bomber||||Prototype||||
|-
|Naval Aircraft Factory TS||US||Propeller||Fighter||||Production||||
|-
|NHIndustries NH90||NATO||Helicopter||||||Production||||
|-
|Nieuport 21||France||Propeller||Trials||–1920||Temporary||||
|-
|Nieuport-Delage NiD 32||France||Propeller||Fighter||||Production||||
|-
|Nieuport-Delage NiD 43||France||Propeller||Fighter||||Prototype||||
|-
|Nord 1500 Noréclair||France||Propeller||ASW/bomber||||Prototype||||
|-
|Nord 2200||France||Jet||Fighter||||Prototype||||
|-
|North American A-5 Vigilante||US||Jet||Reconnaissance||||Production|||| 
|-
|North American AJ Savage||US||Propeller||Bomber||||Production|||| 
|-
|North American B-25B Mitchell||US||Propeller||Bomber||||Temporary||||Doolittle Raid launched from 
|-
|North American ETF-51D Mustang||US||Propeller||Fighter||||Prototype||||
|-
|North American FJ-1 Fury||US||Jet||Fighter||||Production||||
|-
|North American FJ-2/-3 Fury||US||Jet||Fighter||||Production||||
|-
|North American FJ-4 Fury||US||Jet||Fighter||||Production||||
|-
|North American L-17 (Navion)||US||Propeller||Transport||||Temporary||||Korean War Courier/VIP transport
|-
|North American PBJ-1H||US||Propeller||Bomber||||Production||||
|-
|North American Rockwell OV-10 Bronco||US||Propeller||Trials||, 1985||Temporary|||| and 
|-
|North American T-2 Buckeye||US||Jet||Trainer||||Production||||
|-
|North American T-28 Trojan||US||Propeller||Trainer||||Production|||| 
|-
|North American SNJ-3C/-4C/-5C||US||Propeller||Trainer||||Production||+||
|-
|North American XA2J Super Savage||US||Propeller||Bomber||||Prototype||||
|-
|Northrop BT||US||Propeller||Bomber||||Production||||
|-
|Parnall Panther||UK||Propeller||Reconnaissance||||Production||||
|-
|Parnall Perch||UK||Propeller||Trainer||||Prototype||||
|-
|Parnall Pike||UK||Propeller||Reconnaissance||||Prototype||||
|-
|Parnall Pipit||UK||Propeller||Fighter||||Prototype||||
|-
|Parnall Plover||UK||Propeller||Fighter||||Production||||
|-
|Parnall Puffin||UK||Propeller||Fighter/reconnaissance||||Prototype||||
|-
|Percival Vega Gull||UK||Propeller||Transport||/1937||Temporary||||Flown on (by Edgar Percival) and later off and on from  
|-
|Piasecki H-21||US||Helicopter||||||Production||+||
|-
|Piasecki HRP Rescuer||US||Helicopter||Transport/SAR||||Production||||
|-
|Piasecki HUP Retriever||US||Helicopter||Transport/SAR||||Production||||
|-
|Piper L-4 Grasshopper||US||Propeller||Reconnaissance||||Temporary||+||From LST for WW2 landings
|-
|Reggiane Re.2001 OR||Italy||Propeller||Fighter||||Production||||
|-
|Republic P-47 Thunderbolt||US||Propeller||Fighter||||Temporary||||P-47s being ferried by  flown off to defend ship off Saipan
|-
|Rockwell XFV-12||US||Jet||Fighter||n/a||Prototype||||Failed to achieve flight
|-
|Ryan FR Fireball||US||Propeller/Jet||Fighter||||Production||||
|-
|Saro P.531||UK||Helicopter||||||Prototype||||Produced as Westland Wasp
|-
|SEPECAT Jaguar M||France||Jet||Bomber||||Prototype||||
|-
|Seversky XFN-1||US||Propeller||Fighter||||Prototype||||
|-
|Shenyang J-15||PRC||Jet||Fighter||||Production||||
|-
|Shenyang FC-31||PRC||Jet||Fighter||||Prototype||||
|-
|Short Gurnard||UK||Propeller||Fighter||||Prototype||||
|-
|Short Seamew||UK||Propeller||ASW||||Prototype||||
|-
|Short Shirl||UK||Propeller||Torpedo bomber||||Prototype||||
|-
|Sikorsky CH-53 Sea Stallion||US||Helicopter||Transport/SAR||||Production||+||
|-
|Sikorsky HNS (R-4)||US||Helicopter||Transport||||Production||||
|-
|Sikorsky HO2S (R-5/H-5)||US||Helicopter||Transport||||Production||+||
|-
|Sikorsky HO4S (S-55)||US||Helicopter||Transport/SAR||||Production||||
|-
|Sikorsky Hoverfly II (R-6)||US||Helicopter||Transport/trainer||||Production||||
|-
|Sikorsky HR2S/CH-37||US||Helicopter||Transport||||Production||||
|-
|Sikorsky HSS Seabat (S-58)||US||Helicopter||ASW/Transport||||Production||||
|-
|Sikorsky SH-3 Sea King||US||Helicopter||ASW/SAR/Transport||||Production|| ca.||
|-
|Sikorsky SH-60 Seahawk||US||Helicopter||ASW/SAR/Transport||||Production||+||
|-
|Sikorsky XHJS||US||Helicopter||Transport||||Prototype||||
|-
|Slingsby T.20||UK||Glider||Trials||||Temporary||||Flight deck turbulence trials from  & 
|-
|SNCAC NC.1070||France||Jet||Bomber||||Prototype||||
|-
|SNCAC NC.1080||France||Jet||Fighter||||Prototype||||
|-
|SNCASE (Sud-Est) Aquilon||France||Jet||Fighter||||Production||||
|-
|SNCASO SO.8000 Narval||France||Jet||Fighter||||Prototype||||
|-
|Sopwith 2F.1 Ship's Camel||UK||Propeller||Fighter||||Production||||Zeppelin interceptors flown from towed barges.
|-
|Sopwith Camel||UK||Propeller||Fighter||||Production||||Zeppelin interceptors flown from towed barges.
|-
|Sopwith Cuckoo||UK||Propeller||Torpedo bomber||||Production||||
|-
|Sopwith Pup and Ship's Pup||UK||Propeller||Fighter||||Production|||| 
|-
|Sopwith Ship's Strutter||UK||Propeller||Fighter||||Production||||
|-
|-
|Stinson OY Sentinel||US||Propeller||Reconnaissance||||Temporary||+||Korean War
|-
|Sukhoi Su-25UTG & UBP||USSR||Jet||Bomber||||Production||~||
|-
|Sukhoi Su-33||USSR||Jet||Fighter||||Production||~||
|-
|Supermarine Attacker||UK||Jet||Fighter||||Production||||
|-
|Supermarine Scimitar||UK||Jet||Fighter||||Production||||
|-
|Supermarine Seafang||UK||Propeller||Fighter||||Prototype||||
|-
|Supermarine Seafire||UK||Propeller||Fighter||||Production|||| 
|-
|Supermarine Type 322||UK||Propeller||Torpedo/dive bomber||||Prototype||||
|-
|Supermarine Walrus||UK||Propeller||Reconnaissance||||Production||||
|-
|Taylorcraft Auster||UK||Propeller||Trials||–1946||Temporary||+||,  and 
|-
|Vickers Type 141||UK||Propeller||Fighter||||Prototype||||
|-
|Vickers Type 177||UK||Propeller||Fighter||||Prototype||||
|-
|Vickers Type 207||UK||Propeller||Torpedo bomber||||Prototype||||
|-
|Vickers Vanellus||UK||Propeller||Reconnaissance||||Prototype||||
|-
|Vickers Viking III & IV||UK||Propeller||Reconnaissance||||Production||||
|-
|Vickers Vireo||UK||Propeller||Fighter||||Prototype||||
|-
|Villiers II||France||Propeller||Fighter||||Production||||
|-
|Vought A-7 Corsair||US||Jet||Bomber||||Production|||| 
|-
|Vought F-8 Crusader||US||Jet||Fighter||||Production|||| 
|-
|Vought F4U/FG/F3A Corsair||US||Propeller||Fighter||||Production||||
|-
|Vought F6U Pirate||US||Jet||Fighter||||Production||||
|-
|Vought F7U Cutlass||US||Jet||Fighter||||Production|||| 
|-
|Vought FU||US||Propeller||Fighter||||Production||||
|-
|Vought Model 1600||US||Jet||Fighter||n/a||Project||0||
|-
|Vought O2U Corsair||US||Propeller||Reconnaissance||||Production||||
|-
|Vought O3U/SU Corsair||US||Propeller||Reconnaissance||||Production||||
|-
|Vought XO4U Corsair||US||Propeller||Reconnaissance||||Prototype||||
|-
|Vought SB2U Vindicator||US||Propeller||Bomber||||Production||||
|-
|Vought SBU Corsair||US||Propeller||Bomber||||Production||||
|-
|Vought VE-7||US||Propeller||Fighter||||Production||||
|-
|Vought XF5U||US||Propeller||Fighter||n/a||Prototype||1||Failed to achieve flight
|-
|Vought XF8U-3 Crusader III||US||Jet||Fighter||||Prototype||||
|-
|Vought XS2U||US||Propeller||ASW||n/a||Project||0||
|-
|Vought XSB3U||US||Propeller||Bomber||||Prototype||||
|-
|Westland Dragonfly||UK||Helicopter||Transport/SAR||||Production||||
|-
|Westland Lynx||UK||Helicopter||ASW/Transport||||Production||||
|-
|Westland PV-3||UK||Propeller||Reconnaissance||||Prototype||||
|-
|Westland Sea King||UK||Helicopter||ASW/Transport/SAR||||Production||||
|-
|Westland Walrus||UK||Propeller||Reconnaissance||||Production||||
|-
|Westland Wasp||UK||Helicopter||ASW||||Production||||
|-
|Westland Wessex||UK||Helicopter||Transport/SAR||||Production||||
|-
|Westland Whirlwind||UK||Helicopter||Transport/SAR||||Production||||
|-
|Westland Wyvern||UK||Propeller||Bomber||||Production|||| 
|-
|Wibault 74||France||Propeller||Fighter||||Production||||
|-
|Yakovlev Yak-38||USSR||Jet||Fighter||||Production||||
|-
|Yakovlev Yak-41||USSR||Jet||Fighter||||Prototype||||
|-
|Yakovlev Yak-43||USSR||Jet||Fighter||n/a||Project||0||
|-
|Yakovlev Yak-44||USSR||Propeller||AEW||n/a||Project||0||
|-
|Yokosuka B3Y||Japan||Propeller||Bomber||||Production||||
|-
|Yokosuka B4Y||Japan||Propeller||Bomber||||Production||||
|-
|Yokosuka D3Y||Japan||Propeller||Dive bomber||||Prototype||||
|-
|Yokosuka D4Y||Japan||Propeller||Dive bomber||||Production||||
|}

See also
 Carrier-based aircraft
 Carrier aircraft used during World War II
 Naval aviation
 Escort carrier
 List of submarine-borne aircraft

Notes

References

Citations

Bibliography

External links

Lists of aircraft by role
Lists of military aircraft